CIPP  may refer to:
 Certified Information Privacy Professional
 Cured-in-place pipe, a trenchless rehabilitation method used to repair existing pipelines
 CIPP evaluation model (Context, Input, Process, Product)
 The Chartered Institute of Payroll Professionals, a UK professional body.
 Capture, intermediate Purification, and Polishing (CiPP) in affinity chromatography 
 Certified Integrative Psychiatric Provider